Rodovia dos Tamoios (official designation SP-099) is a highway in the Brazilian state of São Paulo. 

The highway is partly dual-lane, part single-lane, and runs from the city of São José dos Campos, located in the Paraíba River valley in the upper plateau of São Paulo down the Serra do Mar to the coastal lowlands of the city of Caraguatatuba, connecting to the Rodovia Rio-Santos (federal highway). As such, it is part of a series of Serra do Mar highways which include Rodovia Anchieta (SP-150) and Rodovia dos Imigrantes (SP-160), departing from São Paulo, the Mogi das Cruzes-Bertioga highway, and the Taubaté-Ubatuba highway. The SP-099 starts at the Rodovia Presidente Dutra, and crosses with Rodovia Carvalho Pinto (SP-070), two huge thoroughfares which direct the road flow from and to São Paulo megalopolis to the Northern coast beach resorts.

It is a high traffic road, particularly on weekends, and it is considered a dangerous one, with high incidence of accidents, specially in its single-lane sections. However, it is one of the most scenic highways of the state, descending from the city of Paraibuna to Caraguatatuba in a short 40 km along the steep cliffs of Serra do Mar facing the sea.

The road is thus named in order to remember the Tamoio, the ethnic group of original Indian tribes who inhabited the coast from Santos to Espírito Santo at the time of discovery, in 1500. It was managed and maintained by the Department of Roads of the State of São Paulo (DER) until April 18, 2015. Now it's maintained by Ecopistas and Concessionária Tamoios. Toll was not required until 2016.

See also
 Highway system of São Paulo

Highways in São Paulo (state)
Sao Jose dos Campos